The following is the final results of the 1981 Asian Wrestling Championships.

Medal table

Team ranking

Medal summary

Men's freestyle

References
UWW Database

Asia
W
Asian Wrestling Championships
W